The final of the Men's 4x200m Freestyle Relay event at the European LC Championships 1997 was held on Wednesday 1997-08-20 in Seville, Spain.

Results

See also
1996 Men's Olympic Games 4x200m Freestyle Relay
1997 Men's World Championships (SC) 4x200m Freestyle

References
 scmsom results

R